The Three Bells is a compilation album by American country music group, the Browns, released in 1993.

This compilation box set release contains eight CDs with 258 songs covering the career of the Browns. Each CD covers a different era of their work, both prior to and after their years with RCA Victor and producer Chet Atkins.

Personnel
Jim Ed Brown – vocals
Maxine Brown – vocals
Bonnie Brown – vocals

References

The Browns albums
Albums produced by Chet Atkins
1993 compilation albums
Bear Family Records compilation albums